Pavel Sedláček may refer to:

Pavel Sedláček (hammer thrower) (born 1968), Czech Olympic hammer thrower
Pavel Sedláček (ice hockey) (born 1994), Czech ice hockey player
Pavel Sedláček (musician) (born 1941), Czech rock and roll singer and guitarist